Amasa Junius Parker (June 2, 1807May 13, 1890) was an attorney, politician and judge from New York.  He is most notable for his service as a member of the New York State Assembly (1834), a U.S. Representative (1837-1839), and a justice of the New York Supreme Court.

A native of Sharon, Connecticut and the son of a prominent clergyman and educator, Parker was raised in upstate New York, received his education from his father and a series of private tutors, and attended Union College, from which he graduated in 1825.  He embarked on a career as a teacher and school principal, which he pursued while studying law.  After attaining admission to the bar in 1828, he practiced in Delhi as the junior partner of his uncle, Amasa Parker.  Active in politics as a Democrat, Parker served as Delaware County District Attorney from 1833 to 1836.  He was a member of the New York State Assembly in 1834 and a regent of the University of the State of New York from 1835 to 1844.  He represented Delaware and Broome Counties in the 25th Congress (1837-1839), after which he returned to practicing law until he became a judge.

In 1844, Parker moved to Albany to begin serving as a judge of the New York State Circuit Court, a position he held until 1847.  Parker became a justice of the New York Supreme Court in 1847, and served until 1855.  In 1854, Parker served as an ex officio judge on the New York Court of Appeals.  After leaving the bench, he again resumed the practice of law.  Parker was a founder of Albany Law School in 1851, and was the unsuccessful Democratic nominee for governor in 1856 and 1858.  In 1867-68 he was a delegate to the state constitutional convention.

Parker died in Albany on May 13, 1890.  He was buried at Albany Rural Cemetery.

Early life
Amasa Junius Parker was born in Sharon, Connecticut on 2 June 1807, the son of Anna (née Fenn) and Rev. Daniel Parker. His father was a Congregational clergyman, and also a teacher in Greenville, New York, and elsewhere.  Parker's family moved to Hudson, New York, in 1816, where he was instructed by his father and several private tutors.  At age 16 in 1823, he was hired as a teacher and principal of Hudson's academy, where he worked until 1827.  In 1825, Parker underwent a comprehensive examination at Union College which covered the curriculum of the school's entire four year program.  He passed easily, and received his degree as a member of that year's graduating class.  In 1827, he began the study of law with attorney John W. Edmonds.  He completed his studies in the Delhi office of his uncle Amasa Parker, was admitted to the bar in 1828, and commenced practice in partnership with his uncle.

Start of career
Parker grew a law practice that expanded to cover several counties adjacent to Delhi, and frequently appeared in both the state circuit and chancery courts.  A Democrat, in 1833, he was elected District Attorney of Delaware County, and he served until 1836.

Parker was a member of the New York State Assembly (Delaware Co.) in 1834 (the 57th New York State Legislature).  He was elected a regent of the University of the State of New York in 1834, the youngest person ever elected to the board, and he served from 1835 to 1844.

Congressman
Parker was elected to the 25th United States Congress as the representative from Delaware and Broome counties, and served from March 4, 1837 to March 3, 1839.  A supporter of President Martin Van Buren, initiatives and issues on which Parker worked while in Congress included Van Buren's unsuccessful Independent Treasury bill (which passed in 1840), the Mississippi election case (which resulted in two Democratic House members being supplanted by Whigs), the operations of the General Land Office and its processes for disposing of public land, and the House's response to the duel between Jonathan Cilley and William J. Graves, which ended in Cilley's death.  After leaving Congress, Parker resumed the practice of law.  In 1839, he was a candidate for the New York State Senate, and lost a close race to Erastus Root.

Judge

Circuit court
In 1844, Parker moved to Albany, New York to accept appointment as judge of the New York State Circuit Courts' Third Circuit, a post he held until the circuit courts were abolished in 1847.  Parker presided at the 1845 trial of Smith A. Boughton (Big Thunder), a leader of the tenants during the Anti-Rent War.  Parker declared a mistrial, and the retrial was heard by John W. Edmonds.  the second trial resulted in a conviction, and Boughton receiving a life sentence, which was later commuted by Governor John Young, who had been elected with the support of the tenants.

State supreme court
Parker was elected to the New York Supreme Court (Third district) in 1847, and he served until 1855.  In 1854, he was one of the ex officio judges of the New York Court of Appeals.  Among his cases on the Court of Appeals was Snedeker v. Warring, a landmark case in the field of fixtures law.  The central question was whether a large, ornamental statue on a country estate should be considered real property or personal property.  Parker's opinion concluded that the statue was real property, and was sustained by a vote of 5 to 2.

The Whig Party had disintegrated by 1855, and when Parker ran for reelection, he was opposed by a candidate of the new Republican Party, George Gould, and Ambrose Z. Jordan, the candidate of the short-lived Know Nothing Party.  Gould narrowly defeated Parker, who left the bench at the end of his term.

Later career

After leaving the bench, Parker resumed practicing law in Albany, and founded a partnership that included former judge Edwin Countryman and Parker's son Amasa J. Parker Jr.  Among his well known cases was his successful argument to the United States Supreme Court that national banks were subject to state taxation.

Parker was one of the founders of the Albany (New York) Law School in 1851, and he was a member of the school's faculty for over twenty years.  He was the unsuccessful Democratic candidate for Governor of New York twice, losing to Republicans John Alsop King in 1856 and Edwin D. Morgan in 1858.  During the administrations of New York's Democratic governors, Parker declined several offers to reappoint him to the bench, and during the presidential administration of James Buchanan he declined appointment as United States Attorney for the Southern District of New York.

During the period before the American Civil War, Parker remained loyal to the Democratic Party and advocated a moderate course in the hope that concessions on the slavery issue would avoid bloodshed. In 1861, he was the permanent chairman of the state Democratic convention.  Once the war started, he supported the Union, but argued against what he saw as the excesses of the Lincoln administration.  In 1864, he successfully argued the case of Palin v. Murray in Greene County, obtaining a judgment for the plaintiff on the grounds of false imprisonment by federal authorities.  The case was later moved to the federal courts, where it was decided in Palin's favor by the U.S. Supreme Court in 1869.

In 1867, Parker was a delegate to the New York State Constitutional Convention of 1867.  He was heavily involved in committees that considered reorganization of the state courts, and successfully advocated abolition of the chancery courts, and the vesting of both law and equity powers in the same courts.  In 1868, Parker took on a rare criminal defense case and obtained an acquittal for George W. Cole on the grounds of temporary insanity after Cole shot and killed L. Harris Hiscock.  In the early 1870s, Parker declined the large retainer offered to defend William Tweed during Tweed's trials for corruption.  In his later years, Parker compiled, edited and published six volumes of reports on criminal cases, and took part with several colleagues in publishing a revised edition of New York's state statutes.

Parker was a longtime promoter of higher education, and served as a trustee or board of governors member of several institutions, including Union College, Cornell University, Albany Medical College, and the Albany Female Academy.  While serving in the Assembly in 1834, Parker advocated the creation of a state hospital for the insane.  When the facility was finally established as the Hudson River State Hospital in the 1860s, Parker was appointed to its board of trustees, and he served until 1881.

Harmanus Bleecker Library
When Harmanus Bleecker died in 1848, he left his estate to his much younger wife with the stipulation that, upon her death, the money would be spent to benefit the city of Albany. She survived him by almost 40 years, and the executor of her estate decided the $130,000 ($ in modern dollars) would best be spent to benefit the Young Men's Association, an organization Bleecker had strongly supported, including service on its board of directors.  Under the terms of Bleecker's will, Parker and John V. L. Pruyn were involved in disposing of his estate, which resulted in construction of Harmanus Bleecker Hall, a library and theater complex, which was built in 1889.  In 1919, the board of the Young Men's Association decided it would be better off with a structure dedicated purely for use as a library.  It sold the hall and used the proceeds to build Harmanus Bleecker Library.  The association deeded the library building to the city in 1924. It was the first library building in the city, and the beginning of Albany's current public library system.  The library later relocated to other facilities, and the Bleecker library building was eventually redeveloped as commercial office space.

Death and burial
Parker continued to practice law into his old age, and argued a case before the state Court of Appeals the week before his death.  He died in Albany on May 13, 1890.  He was buried at Albany Rural Cemetery, Section 54, Lot 8.

Honors
In 1846, Parker received the honorary degree of LL.D. from Geneva College.

Family
On 27 August 1834 Parker married Harriet Langdon Roberts, a daughter of Edmund Roberts and granddaughter of Woodbury Langdon. Among their children were: Amasa J. Parker Jr.; Mary Parker, who married Erastus Corning (1827–1897) and was the mother of Edwin Corning and Parker Corning and grandmother of Erastus Corning 2nd and Edwin Corning Jr.; Anna Fenn Parker (1840–1909), the second wife of John V. L. Pruyn; and Katharine Langdon Parker, the wife of New York Militia General Selden E. Marvin.

Works
An address delivered before the graduating class of the Albany Medical College (1860)

References

Sources

Books

Newspapers

Internet

External links

Biography, Amasa Junius Parker at Historical Society of the New York Courts
Amasa J. Parker at The Political Graveyard

1807 births
1890 deaths
Members of the New York State Assembly
Judges of the New York Court of Appeals
Union College (New York) alumni
New York Supreme Court Justices
Burials at Albany Rural Cemetery
Politicians from Albany, New York
People from Sharon, Connecticut
Democratic Party members of the United States House of Representatives from New York (state)
19th-century American politicians
Lawyers from Albany, New York
19th-century American judges
19th-century American lawyers
Members of the United States House of Representatives from New York (state)